Cidnopus is a genus of click beetle belonging to the family Elateridae subfamily Dendrometrinae.

Species 
Species within this genus include:  
 Cidnopus aeruginosus (A. G. Olivier, 1790)
 Cidnopus crassipes (Schwarz, 1900)
 Cidnopus hubeiensis Kishii & Jiang, 1996
 Cidnopus koltzei (Reitter, 1895)
 Cidnopus macedonicus Cate & Platia, 1989
 Cidnopus marginellus (Perris, 1864)
 Cidnopus marginipennis (Lewis, 1894)
 Cidnopus obienesis (Cherepanov, 1966)
 Cidnopus parallelus (Motschulsky, 1860)
 Cidnopus pilosus (Leske, 1785)
 Cidnopus platiai Mertlik, 1996
 Cidnopus pseudopilosus Platia & Gudenzi, 1985
 Cidnopus ruzenae (Laibner, 1977)
 Cidnopus schurmanni Platia & Gudenzi, 1998
 Cidnopus scutellaris Dolin, 2003
 Cidnopus turcicus Platia, 2004

References 

Elateridae
Beetles of Asia
Beetles of Europe